Eggimann is a Swiss surname which is today mainly present in the Emmental region. Notable people with the surname include:

Mario Eggimann (born 1981), Swiss footballer
Oliver Eggimann (1919–2002), Swiss footballer
Romy Eggimann (born 1995), Swiss ice hockey player

German-language surnames